Frank Angell (July 8, 1857 – November 2, 1939) was an early American psychologist and the former athletic director at Stanford University.

Biography
Angell was born in 1857 in Scituate, Rhode Island. He graduated from the University of Vermont with an undergraduate degree in 1878. Angell spent several years teaching high school physics in Washington, DC.  He earned his PhD in the Leipzig laboratory of Wilhelm Wundt. He then founded the experimental psychology laboratories at Cornell University (1891) and Stanford University (1892). He remained at Stanford for the rest of his career, working primarily on psychophysics and as director of athletics. A track stadium at Stanford was named after him.

He was the nephew of University of Michigan president James B. Angell, and cousin of Yale University president James R. Angell.

Angell in 1891 married Louise Lee Bayard (died 1944), daughter of Secretary of State Thomas F. Bayard. Mrs. Bayard entered into a Hollywood acting career in the 1920s after bearing three children: Charles (died 1949), Thomas Bayard Angell, and daughter Mabel.

References

19th-century psychologists
20th-century American psychologists
Cornell University faculty
1857 births
1939 deaths
University of Vermont alumni
American expatriates in Germany
Stanford University faculty
American psychologists